The Colorado Department of Personnel and Administration (DPA) is the principal department of the Colorado state government responsible for statewide human resources and other support functions.

Structure 
DPA includes the:

References

External links 
 

Personnel and Administration